Inazuma Eleven is a Japanese media franchise with multiple television adaptations. Lists of Inazuma Eleven episodes include:

Original series
 Inazuma Eleven (season 1) 
 Inazuma Eleven (season 2)
 Inazuma Eleven (season 3)

GO series
 List of Inazuma Eleven GO episodes
 List of Inazuma Eleven GO: Chrono Stone episodes
 List of Inazuma Eleven GO: Galaxy episodes

Other series
 List of Inazuma Eleven: Ares episodes
 List of Inazuma Eleven: Orion no Kokuin episodes